The Grammy Award for Best R&B Album is an honor presented at the Grammy Awards, a ceremony that was established in 1958 and originally called the Gramophone Awards, to recording artists for quality works on albums in the R&B music genre. Honors in several categories are presented at the ceremony annually by The Recording Academy of the United States to "honor artistic achievement, technical proficiency and overall excellence in the recording industry, without regard to album sales or chart position".

According to the category description guide for the 54th Grammy Awards, the award is reserved for albums "containing at least 51% playing time of newly recorded contemporary R&B vocal tracks" which may also "incorporate production elements found in rap music". 

From 2003 to 2011, a separate category was formed, the Best Contemporary R&B Album, meant for R&B albums that had modern hip-hop stylings to them, while more traditional and less electronic-styled R&B music still fell under the Best R&B Album category. After the 2011 Grammy season, the Best Contemporary R&B Album category was discontinued and recordings that previously fell under this category were shifted back to the Best R&B Album category. This was part of a major overhaul of the Grammy Award categories. In 2020, a sister category titled Best Progressive R&B Album was debuted.

The award goes to the artist, producer and engineer/mixer, provided they are credited with at least 50% of playing time on the album. A producer or engineer who are responsible for less than 50% of playing time, as well as the mastering engineer, can apply for a Winners Certificate.

Alicia Keys and John Legend are the biggest recipients in this category with three wins. TLC, D'Angelo and Robert Glasper have won the award twice. Mary J. Blige holds the record for the most nominations, with six in total. In 2015, Norwegian singer Bern/hoft became the first non-American artist to be nominated.

Recipients

 Each year is linked to the article about the Grammy Awards held that year.

Artists with multiple wins

3 wins
 Alicia Keys
 John Legend

2 wins
 TLC
 D'Angelo
 Robert Glasper

Artists with multiple nominations

6 nominations
 Mary J. Blige

4 nominations
 Boyz II Men
 India.Arie
 Alicia Keys
 Ledisi
 PJ Morton

3 nominations
 D'Angelo
 Erykah Badu
 Leon Bridges
 Toni Braxton
 Robert Glasper
 R. Kelly
 John Legend
 Maxwell
 Musiq Soulchild
 Prince
 Jill Scott

2 nominations
 Babyface
 Anita Baker
 BJ the Chicago Kid
 Chris Brown
 Fantasia
 Aretha Franklin
 Al Green
 H.E.R.
 Anthony Hamilton
 Whitney Houston
 Joe
 Lucky Daye
 Me'Shell NdegéOcello
 Raphael Saadiq
 Jazmine Sullivan
 TLC
 Luther Vandross
 Charlie Wilson

See also

 List of Grammy Award categories
 List of R&B musicians
 Top R&B/Hip-Hop Albums

References

General
 

Specific

External links
Official site of the Grammy Awards